The Sunshine Bridge is a cantilever bridge over the Mississippi River in St. James Parish, Louisiana. Completed in 1963, it carries Louisiana Highway 70 (LA 70), which connects Donaldsonville on the west bank of Ascension Parish with Sorrento on the east bank of Ascension Parish as well as with Gonzales on the east bank of Ascension Parish.  The approach roads on the east and west banks begin in Ascension Parish before crossing into St. James Parish.

The bridge is a convenient river crossing for residents of Baton Rouge, Hammond, and the Florida Parishes to travel to the Bayou cities of Morgan City, Houma and Thibodaux as well as vice versa. The bridge plays an important role in storm evacuation and in industrial development along the Mississippi.

From its opening in 1964 through August 15, 2001, a 50-cent toll was collected on traffic crossing to the west bank. The toll was discontinued by an act of the Louisiana Legislature, authored by Louisiana State Representative Roy Quezaire (D-Donaldsonville), whose district included the bridge.

Bridges to Nowhere
The bridge gained national attention in 2008 when it became part of the Bridge to Nowhere controversy which arose during the US Presidential Election.  Focused primarily on the Alaskan Governor/Vice Presidential Candidate  Sarah Palin's efforts to secure federal funding for the Gravina Island Bridge, the Sunshine Bridge was placed into the same category.  While the only bridge across the Mississippi between New Orleans and Baton Rouge when it opened for traffic in 1964, its south end then emptied into a swamp, and for years it awaited funding to connect it to LA 70 and other roads. When this occurred, the economy in this area grew by leaps and bounds, largely due to the improved transportation. 

Much of the criticism involved residual resentment from the bridge being named to recognize Governor Jimmie Davis.  Built under his administration, Davis had twice picked and sung his way into the Governor's Mansion with hits like "You Are My Sunshine" and whose horse, which he rode into the Governor's office at his second inaugural, was also named Sunshine.

2018 Barge collision and closure

On the morning of October 12, 2018, a crane being transported on a barge operated by Marquette Transportation collided with The Sunshine Bridge. The crane was reportedly being transported while its boom was still in an upright position. Due to extensive damage done to a main load carrying span, the Sunshine Bridge was immediately closed to all vehicle traffic for emergency repairs. These repairs were expected to be completed in late January or early February 2019. The eastbound lanes were projected to reopen in April, and the bridge was planned to be fully reopened in August. The loss of this Mississippi River crossing meant that traffic was required to take a significant detour to either the Gramercy Bridge or the Horace Wilkinson Bridge, a detour that was at least  in length.

Gallery

See also
List of crossings of the Lower Mississippi River

References

External links
Sunshine Bridge and the Acadian Thruway
 

Bridges over the Mississippi River
Bridges completed in 1963
Buildings and structures in St. James Parish, Louisiana
Road bridges in Louisiana
Transportation in St. James Parish, Louisiana
Former toll bridges in Louisiana
Cantilever bridges in the United States